For Them That Trespass is a 1949 British crime film directed by Alberto Cavalcanti and starring Richard Todd, Patricia Plunkett and Stephen Murray. It is an adaptation of the 1944 novel of the same name by Ernest Raymond.

The film's main theme is miscarriage of justice. In the film, a professional writer witnesses a murder. He decides not to testify on behalf of an innocent man accused of the crime, wishing to protect his own reputation. The innocent man spends 15 years in prison for the murder. Once released, he tries to clear his name.

Plot
Promising writer Christopher Drew conceals his relationship with a murdered woman in order to protect his career, even though this results in an innocent man going to prison for the killing.

The upper-class Drew decides he needs some first-hand experience to invigorate his work, so he explores the seedier areas of town in search of inspiration. Much to his dismay, he witnesses a murder, but he then refuses to help an innocent man, Herbert Logan, who has been arrested for the crime, because his presence in such a neighbourhood would cause a scandal. Logan is freed after serving 15 years in jail. He hears his "crime" detailed in a radio drama written by Drew and gathers enough evidence to clear his name.

Cast
 Richard Todd as Herbert Edward Logan
 Patricia Plunkett as Rosie
 Stephen Murray as Christopher Drew
 Michael Laurence as Jim Heal
 Vida Hope as Olive Mockson
 Rosalyn Boulter as Frankie Ketchen
 James Hayter as 'Jocko': John Cragie Glenn
 Harry Fowler as Dave
 George Hayes as Artist
 Michael Brennan as Inspector Benstead
 Joan Dowling as Gracie
 Michael Medwin as Len
 Mary Merrall as Mrs. Drew
 Irene Handl as Inn owner
 John Salew as Ainsley, Prosecutor
 Robert Harris as Sir Huntley, Defence counsel
 Kynaston Reeves as The Judge
 Helen Cherry as Mary Drew
 Frederick Leister as The Vicar
 Edward Lexy as the Second Prison Warder
 Valentine Dyall as Toastmaster
 Charles Lloyd Pack as Theatre Critic
 Andreas Malandrinos as Nicholas
 George Merritt (actor) as Engine Driver
 Kenneth Moore (1914-1982) - as Prison Warder
 Alan Wheatley as Librarian

Production
Richard Todd was cast after a screen test. It was his first leading role. His casting was announced in July 1948. He was also signed to a seven-year contract with Associated British.

The film led to Todd being cast in The Hasty Heart.

Critical reception
The New York Times called it "a drab and dreary little film". On the other hand, Sky Movies calls it a "gripping movie drama which has a lot of high feeling and style. ... Still impressive, though more than 40 years after."

Todd called it "dreary" but it led to him being offered a long-term contract with Associated British.

References

External links

1949 films
1949 crime films
Films directed by Alberto Cavalcanti
Films based on British novels
British black-and-white films
British crime films
Films with screenplays by J. Lee Thompson
Films about writers
Films about miscarriage of justice
Films about murder
1940s English-language films
1940s British films